Hurricane Hector was a powerful and long-lasting tropical cyclone that traversed the Pacific Ocean during late July and August 2018. Hector was the eighth named storm, fourth hurricane, and third major hurricane of the 2018 Pacific hurricane season. It originated from a disturbance that was located north of South America on July 22. The disturbance tracked westward and entered the eastern Pacific around July 25. It gradually organized over the next several days, becoming a tropical depression at 12:00 UTC on July 31. The system was upgraded into a tropical storm about 12 hours later and received the name Hector. Throughout most of its existence, the cyclone traveled due west or slightly north of west. A favorable environment allowed the fledgling tropical storm to rapidly intensify to its initial peak as a Category 2 hurricane by 18:00 UTC on August 2. Wind shear caused Hector to weaken for a brief period before the storm began to strengthen again. Hector reached Category 3 status by 00:00 UTC on August 4 and went through an eyewall replacement cycle soon after, which caused the intensification to halt. After the replacement cycle, the cyclone continued to organize, developing a well-defined eye surrounded by cold cloud tops.

Hector crossed the 140th meridian west, entering the central Pacific Ocean early on August 6 as a Category 4 hurricane. Hector's intensity fluctuated between Category 3 and Category 4 over the next several days as a result of eyewall replacement cycles and changing environmental conditions. The hurricane passed south of Hawaii's Big Island on August 8. Strong wind shear caused Hector to weaken rapidly and take on a more northwestward track after August 11. It fell below major hurricane intensity around 18:00 UTC on August 11. Hector had spent 186 hours at that intensitylonger than any other hurricane on record in the eastern Pacific basin. The structure of the storm rapidly deteriorated as Hector approached the International Date Line; it weakened into a tropical storm by 00:00 UTC on August 13. Hector crossed into the western Pacific Ocean during the middle of the day. The tropical storm then moved generally westward while continuing to decay. It weakened into a tropical depression by midnight UTC on August 15 and dissipated the next day around 18:00 UTC.

The impact on land from the storm was minimal. Hector did not make landfall, but as it approached Hawaii, tropical storm watches and warnings were issued for the Big Island, as well as tropical storm watches for the Northwestern Hawaiian Islands. Hector caused high surf as it passed by to the south of the main islands, necessitating the rescue of several dozen people on Oahu.

Origins, development, and initial peak

Hurricane Hector's origins can be traced to a low-latitude disturbance that was located north of French Guiana and Suriname around July 22. The disturbance's path prior to that time is uncertain: thunderstorm activity was subdued across the tropical Atlantic due to the presence of dry Saharan air, and the Intertropical Convergence Zone dipped southward and exhibited no fluctuations; this combination of events made it impossible to trace the disturbance to a particular tropical wave. Hector's precursor began producing convection while traveling westward over northern South America, entering the Eastern Pacific basin by July 25. A low-pressure trough formed on the next day south of Central America and southern Mexico. The National Hurricane Center (NHC) first mentioned the possibility of tropical development on July 26. Located within a favorable environment fueled by a kelvin wave and the Madden–Julian oscillation, the disturbance gradually became more organized over the next five days as it continued generally westward. At that time, the system was travelling west-northwest under the influence of a deep-layer ridge to its north. Initially, the depression was irregularly shaped and its circulation elongated, but it steadily improved in organization over the next 12 hours, becoming Tropical Storm Hector at 00:00 UTC on August 1.

After strengthening into a tropical storm, Hector remained disorganized for several hours as a result of increasing easterly wind shear, with most of its convection displaced to the south and west. Warm sea surface temperatures of  allowed Hector to begin a 30-hour period of rapid intensification at 12:00 UTC. Around that time, the low- and mid-level centers were becoming more aligned and curved banding features were increasing. The system also turned westward as the aforementioned ridge built to the north of Hector. Over the next several hours, Hector significantly improved in organization, with its low-level center becoming markedly embedded within the deep convection and the development of a mid-level eye. Hector intensified into a Category 1 hurricane on the Saffir-Simpson scale around 12:00 UTC, developing a small eye on satellite imagery. Shortly thereafter, Hector began weakening, with its eye becoming cloud-filled and the northern eyewall eroding due to northerly shear. Hector's structure continued to degrade over the next several hours with the eye becoming nearly indistinguishable from its surroundings and the formation of a secondary concentric eyewall structure. The storm bottomed out as a Category 1 hurricane at approximately 12:00 UTC on August 3 as it continued to travel due west.

Strengthening and peak intensity

Hector began to strengthen a short time later as it traversed an area of slightly cooler sea temperatures, low wind shear, and elevated mid-level moisture. The storm's eye cleared out on satellite imagery as convection intensified in the eyewall. Later in the day, the system began to undergo an eyewall replacement cycle. Six hours later, around 18:00 UTC, the eyewall cycle had completed, with only one eyewall remaining. At that time, the cyclone was also beginning to acquire some annular characteristics. The hurricane's structure began to decay on August 5, with the eye becoming less distinct by 12:00 UTC. Meanwhile, microwave imagery showed two concentric eyewalls, indicating that Hector was entering a second eyewall replacement cycle. Hector became a Category 4 hurricane at 18:00 UTC after completing the eyewall cycle. The hurricane exhibited a symmetric central dense overcast with few banding features elsewhere, a characteristic of an annular tropical cyclone.

Hector began to move slightly north of west due to a weakness in a subtropical ridge located to the northeast of the Hawaiian Islands. The hurricane crossed the 140th meridian west shortly after 06:00 UTC on August 6, entering the Central Pacific Hurricane Center's (CPHC) area of responsibility. At that time, Hector possessed a distinct eye surrounded by  clouds. The storm turned towards the west-northwest shortly after as the ridge continued to weaken. The hurricane maintained peak intensity for about six hours before beginning to weaken as it entered an area of mid-level dry air.

Passage south of Hawaii and secondary peak

As Hector approached Hawaii, its weakening trend continued due to mid-level dry air, low ocean heat content, and  sea surface temperatures. The hurricane's eye shrank and became nearly indistinguishable from surrounding clouds on satellite imagery as the system tracked westward. WSR-88D radar from Hawaii as well as microwave and satellite imagery showed Hector was undergoing a third eyewall replacement cycle during that time.

Hurricane Hector warranted the issuance of tropical storm watches and warnings from August 6–8 as it passed near the Big Island, as well as tropical storm watches for Johnston Atoll and various islands in the Papahānaumokuākea Marine National Monument from August 9–13. Although forecasts depicted Hector remaining south of Hawaii, concerns were raised over the safety of residents displaced by the ongoing eruption of Kīlauea, many of whom were in temporary tent structures that could not withstand a hurricane. Plans were made to relocate people to sturdier structures. The ports of Hilo and Kawaihae were closed on August 7 to inbound traffic as gale-force winds were expected to occur within the next 24 hours. All Hawaiian ports resumed normal operations on August 10. Also on August 8, the acting mayor of Hawaii County, Wil Okabe, declared a state of emergency. As the hurricane passed south of the island on August 8, all absentee walk-in voting sites in Hawaii County were shut down. Whittington, Punaluu, and Milolii Beach Parks were also closed. At least 90 people had to be rescued on Oahu due to dangerous swells generated by the cyclone.

After passing by Hawaii, Hector began another period of strengthening on August 9 as it moved across a region of slightly warmer sea surface temperatures and higher ocean heat content. The temperature of the hurricane's eye increased and the cloud tops of the eyewall cooled after the completion of the replacement cycle. Hector reached its secondary peak as a Category 4 hurricane around 18:00 UTC on August 10 with  winds. Around that time, the system had begun a west-northwest motion as it rounded the edge of a subtropical ridge that was located northeast.

Weakening and demise

Hector began to weaken once more as an upper-level low located just east of the International Date Line imparted southerly shear and caused the cyclone to take on a more northwesterly track. As a result, the storm's eye became cloud-filled on August 11. Hector fell below major hurricane status around 18:00 UTC on August 11, the first time the hurricane had done so after spending a record 186 consecutive hours at that intensity. By early August 12, the hurricane's eye had become invisible on satellite imagery and only a region of warmer cloud tops remained on infrared imagery. Later in the day, Hector's low-level center became displaced to the south of its thunderstorm activity as strong wind shear continued to bombard the system. Hector weakened into a tropical storm around 00:00 UTC on August 13. Convection associated with Hector began to dissipate on August 13, leaving the low-level center uncovered; all that remained were regions of cirrus clouds. Hector crossed into the western Pacific Ocean shortly after 15:00 UTC on August 13 as a weakening tropical storm, entering the Japan Meteorological Agency's (JMA) area of responsibility. Around that time, bursts of convection had formed northwest of the low-level center. At the time Hector left the eastern Pacific basin, it had the highest accumulated cyclone energy of a Pacific hurricane since 1994's Hurricane John.

Once Hector crossed the International Date Line, the JMA recognized it as a tropical storm with  10-minute sustained winds. After entering the western Pacific, Hector tracked westward under the influence of a subtropical high. The tropical storm's structure consisted of weak banding features and a low-level center partially covered by convection on August 14. At the same time, Hector was located within an environment of dry air, low-to-moderate wind shear, and neutral  sea surface temperatures. Around 06:00 UTC, the JTWC downgraded Hector to a tropical depression. Convection continually decreased in organization throughout the day. Meanwhile, the storm turned towards the west-northwest as it rounded the southern edge of the subtropical high. At 00:00 UTC on August 15, the JMA downgraded Hector to a tropical depression. At the same time, the JTWC indicated that Hector had transitioned into a subtropical storm with no change in intensity. The JTWC downgraded Hector to a subtropical depression around 12:00 UTC on August 15. The JTWC continued tracking Hector until 06:00 UTC on August 16, while the JMA monitored the cyclone until 18:00 UTC of that day.

See also

 Weather of 2018
 Tropical cyclones in 2018
 List of Category 4 Pacific hurricanes
 Other tropical cyclones with the same name
 List of Hawaii hurricanes
 Hurricane Dora (1999) – another hurricane that traversed all three North Pacific basins
 Hurricane Ioke (2006) – a storm that set similar longevity records
 Hurricane Lane (2018) – Category 5 hurricane that became Hawaii's wettest tropical cyclone on record

Notes

References

External links

 The National Hurricane Center's advisory archive on Hurricane Hector
 The Central Pacific Hurricane Center's advisory archive on Hurricane Hector

2018 Pacific hurricane season
2018 Pacific typhoon season
Category 4 Pacific hurricanes
Hurricanes in Hawaii
Hector